Limadora is a genus of land snails with an operculum, terrestrial gastropod mollusks in the family Pomatiidae.

Species 
Species within the genus Limadora include:
 Limadora garciana (Aguayo, 1932)
 Limadora scabrata (Torre & Bartsch, 1941)
 Limadora tollini (Ramsden, 1915)

References 

Pomatiidae